Gorella Gori (2 February 1900 – 25 November 1963) was an Italian entertainer (including cafe-chantant),  stage actor and film actress. She appeared in twenty five films, generally in supporting or minor roles. One of her later roles was a small part in Roman Holiday (1953).

Partial filmography

 In the Country Fell a Star (1939) - La moglie de Teodorico
 Big Shoes (1940) - Concetta, la cuoca
 Lucky Night (1941)
 La compagnia della teppa (1941) - La signora Borghi
 Street of the Five Moons (1942) - La comare grassottella
 Perdizione (1942) - Amalia, l'infermiera
 The Gorgon (1942) - Berta
 The Peddler and the Lady (1943) - La cameriera della casa Giovannini
 Annabella's Adventure (1943)
 La storia di una capinera (1943)
 The Priest's Hat (1944) - Chiarina
 Il vento m'ha cantato una canzone (1947)
 Il nido di Falasco (1950)
 Never Take No for an Answer' (1951) - Weaver's Wife
 Toto and the King of Rome (1952)
 Roman Holiday (1953) - Shoe Seller
 Disonorata - Senza colpa (1954)
 Angela (1954) - Nurse
 Oh! Sabella (1957)
 Una pelliccia di visone (1957)

References

Bibliography
 Pirolini, Alessandro.  The Cinema of Preston Sturges: A Critical Study''.  McFarland, 2010.

External links

1900 births
1963 deaths
Italian film actresses
Actresses from Rome
20th-century Italian actresses